Desh Drohi ( Traitor) is a 1980 Indian Hindi-language action film produced by Bhagwant Singh and G. L. Khanna. The film is directed by Prakash Mehra. The film stars Saira Banu, Navin Nischol, Asrani, Ranjeet. The film's music is by Kalyanji-Anandji. The film was released on 01 February 1980.

Cast
 Saira Banu
 Navin Nischol
 Asrani
 Ranjeet
 Padma Khanna
 Dev Kumar
 Pran
 Keshto Mukherjee
 Madan Puri
 Yunus Parvez
 Rakesh Pandey
 P. Jairaj
 R.P. Sethi
 Ram Mohan
 Sunil Dhawan

Crew
Director - Prakash Mehra
Producer - Bhagwant Singh and G. L. Khanna
Story -  Mohan Kaul
Writer - Satish Bhatnagar
Dialogue - Satish Bhatnagar
Editor - V. N. Mayekar
Cinematographer - N. Satyan
Audiography – K. S. Rane
Action – Veeru Devgan
Banner – Sangam Art International, Bombay
 Assistant Music Director  – Babla,Frank

Music

References

External links
 

1980 films
Indian action films
1980s Hindi-language films
1980 action films
Hindi-language action films